Marcelo Demoliner and Rodrigo Guidolin defeated 6–4, 6–2 their compatriots Ricardo Mello and Caio Zampieri in the final.

Seeds

Draw

Draw

References
 Doubles Draw

Aberto de Brasilia - Doubles
Aberto de Brasília